Graffiti Soul is the fifteenth studio album (of original material) by Scottish rock band Simple Minds, released in May 2009.

On 31 May 2009, the album entered the UK Albums Chart at No. 10, becoming Simple Minds' first UK top ten album in 14 years, since the release of their 1995 album Good News from the Next World.

In early April 2009, the video for the single "Rockets" was made available via the band's official website.

Overview
Graffiti Soul was released on 25 May 2009 and continued Simple Minds return to the top, charting at #10.

During the recording of Graffiti Soul, Jim Kerr stated: «We really are flowing with ideas at the moment and [...] I do feel that we are possibly writing two albums simultaneously at present.» Several tracks were omitted from Graffiti Soul so that the album had more focus. Possible candidates include "Six Degrees Of Separation", "Lotus Effect" and "Shaman".

At the time of the album release, Charlie Burchill stated about the new album: «We would create ideas and work on those ideas for hours. That's the way we worked upon Graffiti Soul'''s tracks; we worked upon ideas and just let them evolve over long periods of time.»

 Recording 
An e-mail announcement by Simple Minds stated that Graffiti Soul was initially written on location in Rome (Italy), Sicily, Antwerp (Belgium) and Glasgow (Scotland). The band then returned for the first time in almost three decades to Rockfield Studios, near Monmouth in Wales, where the group originally recorded their earlier albums Real to Real Cacophony, Empires and Dance and New Gold Dream.  The album was mixed in Los Angeles by Bob Clearmountain.

 Release Graffiti Soul is also available as a vinyl LP and a 2-CD deluxe edition, both including a second album called Searching for the Lost Boys, actually a covers studio album made up of cover songs of Neil Young, Massive Attack, Magazine, The Stranglers, Thin Lizzy, Siouxsie and the Banshees, The Call and The Beach Boys.

 Reception 
The album received generally mixed reviews upon release. Metacritic gives it a score of 58 out of 100 based on 5 critics, indicating "mixed or average reviews".

The NME's John Doran was underwhelmed, describing it as, "easily the best thing they've done since the mid-’80s...but it's still not enough. If Simple Minds had stopped the second "Don't You (Forget About Me)" was released then they’d still be remembered as a truly great band. As it is, this is not enough on its own to restore their tarnished reputation." In The Telegraph, Thomas H. Green noted the album's production as being, "polished to a US radio-friendly sheen", whilst offering that the album is, "not a sudden, flawless comeback, by any means, but for fans who've been waiting for Simple Minds to relocate their previous form, Graffiti Soul is well worth a listen."

Track listing 
Standard edition

Deluxe Edition bonus tracks

Vinyl LP / 2-CD Deluxe Editions – Bonus album Searching for the Lost Boys

 Personnel 
Simple Minds
 Jim Kerr – vocals
 Charlie Burchill – guitars, keyboards
 Mel Gaynor – drums
 Eddie Duffy – bass
Additional musicians
 Gordy Goudie – guitar and keyboards (2), backing vocals (1-3, 5-8) 
 Jez Coad – backing vocals (1-3, 5-8), timpani (3), additional keyboards (4, 5, 7), additional drums (4) 
 Katie Kissoon – backing vocals (2-6, 8) 
 Sonia Jones – backing vocals (2-6, 8)
 Tom Hooper – percussion (3, 5-8)
 Andy Gillespie – additional keyboards (5)
Technical
 Jez Coad – producer, mixing (7, 9)
 Simple Minds – producer
 Arjen Mesinga – engineer 
 Simon Dawson – engineer 
 Mark Bishop – engineer  
 Ben Cunningham – assistant engineer
 Gordy Goudie – additional pre-production
 Andy Gillespie – additional pre-production
 Kevin Burleigh – additional pre-production  
 Bob Clearmountain – mixing (1-6, 8, 10)
 Brandon Duncan – mixing assistant (1-6, 8, 10)
 Bob Ludwig – mastering
 Joe Blake – design
 Chris Gallagher– design
 Ryan MacDonald – design
 Mark Seager – photography
 Sven Hoogerhuis – photography
 Hilko Nackaerts – photography

 Left-overs 
At least, four other tracks, "Six Degrees of Separation", "Lotus Effect", "Shaman" and "Angel Under My Skin" were demoed for Graffiti Soul. Originally written by Mark Kerr and Erikah Karst during the Cry period (2002), "Angel Under My Skin" was previously worked on for Black & White 050505 (2005) before the song was finally recorded and released as a Deluxe edition bonus track on Walk Between Worlds'' (2018).

Live performances 

Many of the songs have been played live:

"Moscow Underground", "Rockets" and "Stars Will Lead the Way": during the 2009 "30 Years Live European", 2009 "Graffiti Soul", 2010 "Australian", 2010 "Festival Show" and 2010 "Final Shows" tours.
"Moscow Underground": also during the 2011 "Greatest Hits Forest", 2011 "Greatest Hits +", 2012 "Festival", 2012 "Australia" tours and at the 2011 "Australia" "600 Sounds" Festival show.
"Stars Will Lead the Way": also during the 2011 "Greatest Hits +" and 2012 "Festival" tours.
"Light Travels": only one time as an encore (in Rome, Italy) and another time as a soundcheck (in Ancona, Italy) during the 2009 "Graffiti Soul" tour.
"Kiss and Fly": only one time as a soundcheck (in Birmingham, UK) during the 2009 "Graffiti Soul" tour.
"Graffiti Soul": during the 2009 "Graffiti Soul" and 2010 "Festival Show" tours.
"This Is It": during the 2009 "30 Years Live European", 2009 "Graffiti Soul", 2010 "Festival Show" and 2010 "Final Shows" tours.
"Rockin' In The Free World": only one time as a spontaneous improvisation launched by Jim during the 2009 "30 Years Live European" tour and another time as a soundcheck (in Birmingham, UK) during the 2009 "Graffiti Soul" tour.
"Teardrop" only four times: (as an encore) during the Lostboy! AKA's 2010 "Electroset Radio" tour and only one time (as an encore) during the Lostboy! AKA's 2010 "Electroset" tour.
"Whiskey In The Jar": only one time (in Cork, Ireland) during the 2009 "30 Years Live European" tour.

Charts

Weekly charts

Year-end charts

References

Sources
 Official Simple Minds web site
 Dream Giver Redux

2009 albums
Simple Minds albums
Sanctuary Records albums
Albums recorded at Rockfield Studios